FC Spartak-2 Moscow was a Russian football team from Moscow, founded in 1964. It was a farm club for the Russian Premier League team FC Spartak Moscow.

History
The club has participated in professional competition in the past, as FC Spartak-d Moscow (Russian Second League in 1992–1993, Russian Third Division in 1994–1997) and as FC Spartak-2 Moscow (Russian Second Division in 1998–2000). It started playing professionally again in 2013 in the third-tier Russian Professional Football League.

On 24 May 2015, they secured the top spot in the West Zone of the PFL and promotion for the first time in history to the second-tier Russian Football National League for the 2015–16 season.

On 23 May 2022, FC Spartak Moscow announced that Spartak-2 will be dissolved and not participate in the 2022–23 season for budgetary reasons.

References

External links
  Official website

Association football clubs established in 2013
Association football clubs disestablished in 2022
Defunct football clubs in Moscow
FC Spartak Moscow
2013 establishments in Russia
2022 disestablishments in Russia